Đoàn Hùng Sơn (born 30 November 1986) is a Vietnamese footballer who plays as a midfielder for V-League (Vietnam) club SHB Đà Nẵng F.C.

Honours

Club
SHB Đà Nẵng
 V.League 1: 2009, 2012; runners-up: 2013
 Vietnamese Super Cup: 2012; runners-up: 2009
 Vietnamese Cup: 2009; runners-up: 2013
Quảng Nam
 V.League 1: 2017

References 

1986 births
Living people
Vietnamese footballers
Association football midfielders
V.League 1 players
SHB Da Nang FC players
Quang Nam FC players